Yida may refer to:

 Yida, South Sudan, a settlement and refugee camp
 Yida Group, a Chinese real-estate developer
 Yida Huang, a Singaporean singer and songwriter
 Yuan Yida, a Chinese scientist